Harasankar Bhattacharya Institute of Technology and Mining,  is the best government polytechnic located in Raniganj,  Paschim Bardhaman district, West Bengal. This polytechnic is affiliated to the West Bengal State Council of Technical Education,  and recognized by AICTE, New Delhi. This polytechnic offers diploma courses in Electronics & Instrumentation, Survey, and Mining Engineering.

References

External links
 Admission to Polytechnics in West Bengal for Academic Session 2006-2007

Universities and colleges in Paschim Bardhaman district
Educational institutions established in 1994
1994 establishments in West Bengal
Technical universities and colleges in West Bengal